Riga Stradiņš University (RSU) is a public university located in the city of Riga, Latvia. The Stradiņš (pronounced [ˈstradiɲʃ]) name in the university's title is owed to members of the Stradiņš family who have had a significant influence on the course of community and academic life in Latvia for over a century.

Riga Stradiņš University  

In 1950, Riga Medical Institute was established on the basis of the Faculty of Medicine of the State University of Latvia. The initiators were professors Pauls Stradiņš (1896–1958) and Ernests Burtnieks (1950–1958) - the first Director of Riga Medical Institute, and Healthcare Minister of the Republic of Latvia Ādolfs Krauss. Initially the institute included the faculties of medicine, dentistry and pharmacy, as well as 45 departments.

Rīga Stradiņš University is a state-funded university which offers various study programmes and ensures the realisation of scientific projects, providing training of experts in health care and social sciences who work in Latvia and across the world. It is the only university in Latvia which has traditionally been integrated into the healthcare system of the country, and therefore ensures a successful run of the university, which is a precondition for an effective existence of the health care system in Latvia.

RSU is autonomous and academically free to pursue its goals and tasks, working for the benefit of the state and society, and offering a wide array of academic and professional education and research opportunities in the fields of health care, social care, social sciences and natural sciences.

Riga Stradiņš University is ranked in the top 801-1000 universities in the world, and top 501–550 in medicine by the QS world rankings.

History 

On 2 February 1920, Swedish professor Gaston Bakman held the first lecture on human anatomy in the Theatrum Anatomicum Rigense (currently Anatomical Theatre in Riga). This lecture was the forebearer of higher education in medicine in Latvia. Professor Gaston Bakman believed that this was also the beginning of the Institute of Anatomy and Histology, as well as the Museum of Anatomy in Riga.

After World War II, only two professors of medicine remained in Latvia, one of whom was Professor Pauls Stradiņš, who in a very short time as the Dean of the Faculty of Medicine managed to rebuild and renew the education and science of medicine from scratch. In 1950, during the Soviet occupation the Riga Medical Institute (Latvian: Rīgas Medicīnas institūts; ; Latin: Institutum Medical Riga) was established on the basis of the Faculty of Medicine of the State University of Latvia. Initially the institute included the faculties of medicine, dentistry and pharmacy, as well as 45 departments.

In 1990, the institute was renamed Medical Academy of Latvia (Latvian: Latvijas Medicīnas akadēmija, Latin: Academia Medicinaei Latviensis), but already on 5 April 1998, the Constitutional Assembly made the decision to rename Medical Academy of Latvia, based on its actual activities as Riga Stradiņš University. Riga Stradiņš University in time developed into a university type higher education institution, as it trains experts not only in the fields of medicine and pharmacy, but also offers study programmes in social sciences, natural sciences, public health and law. On 13 June 2002, Riga Stradiņš University Act came into effect and Medical Academy of Latvia was renamed Riga Stradiņš University.

Structure 
Riga Stradiņš University's nine faculties provide undergraduate as well as postgraduate level studies in various programmes. High school students as well as doctors of science have the opportunity to study at RSU and enhance their education, and make a contribution to the creation of knowledge and new technologies.

Currently there are 9 faculties at RSU:

Medical Sciences 
 Faculty of Dentistry
 Faculty of Medicine
 Faculty of Pharmacy
 Faculty of Public Health and Social Welfare
 Faculty of Rehabilitation

Social Sciences 
 Faculty of Communications (including Department of Communication Studies and Department of Sociology)
 Faculty of European Studies (including Department of Political Science and Department of Economics)

Law 
 Faculty of Law

Post-graduate departments 
 Faculty of Continuing Education
 Division of Doctoral Studies

There is also a department for international students studying at RSU, the International Student Department

University students can choose full-time studies, which require undivided attention as well as part-time studies, which can usually be combined with work. Medicine and health care students at various levels of study can access state budget funded study places, whereas the best social science students receive discounts on their tuition fees.

Liepāja Branch 
Riga Stradiņš University (RSU) Liepāja branch is the place where for over 70 years various health care professionals have been trained. 
Currently the RSU Liepāja branch offers first level professional higher education in health care, offering the following programmes: Medical massage, Nursing, Physicians' Assistant and Health Sport Specialist with approximately 200 students enrolled. Health care specialists may also choose the Bachelor's study programme Nursing and the Master's study programme Nursing.

Study programmes Nursing and Health Sport Specialist offered at RSU Liepāja branch are identical in terms of content to the study programmes that are offered at RSU in Riga. Following placement, most students start working in the same health care institutions where placement was completed.

Students and teaching 

RSU has a student teacher ratio of 1:10. The total number of students is approximately 10,000, while the total number of RSU employees stands at around 1,800, with 370 academic staff members. The language of instruction at RSU is primarily Latvian, however an increasing number of faculties and departments additionally offer programmes in English for international students studying Medicine, Dentistry, Pharmacy, Nursing, Physiotherapy, Public Health, Health Management, International Business and Start-up Entrepreneurship and International Governance and Diplomacy, etc. One third of all international students in Latvia study at RSU and currently international students constitute more than 27% of the student body of the university. In 2022 In 2022 out of 2620 international students 30% came from Germany, 26% from Sweden, 12,5% from Finland and 7% from Norway 4.5% from Italy, 2.4% form India, 2.2% from Portugal, and 2.2% from Israel. In the same year, 88% of foreign students studied in the Faculty of Medicine and 11% in the Faculty of Dentistry. Even though 87% of international students are from the EU/EEA countries, RSU students represent 70 different countries creating an active multicultural study and social environment at RSU. In the same year, 87.6% of international students studied in the Faculty of Medicine and 11.2% in the Faculty of Dentistry.[3] RSU has also developed partnerships with more than 150 Erasmus+ partner universities and welcomes international exchange students form different countries every semester.

The Riga Stradiņš University is ranked in the top 801 universities in the world by QS World Ranking. and the RSU’s Study Centre at Rīga East Clinical University Hospital. Moreover, besides RSU having close affiliation with leading hospitals in Riga and regions of Latvia, RSU offers its international students internships at partner hospitals in Germany, Italy and Israel.

RSU offers its students innovative and developed study environment – renovated buildings, Wi-Fi free campuses, latest technologies in student teaching and practical training. Medical students have their studies at different study bases including RSU’s Theatrum Anatomicum. In senior years, students undergo their practical training at RSU’s Medical Education Technology Centre.

The same applies to the teaching methods and technology solutions for students studying dentistry. The dental programme is implemented in the University's pre-clinical learning centre, where dentistry students start practicing on pre-clinical dental equipment already in their 1st year, alongside more theoretical subjects like anatomy, biochemistry, biology and microbiology. The initial learning phase takes place in the virtual environment on various 3D simulators, which help students adjust to dental equipment and the features they provide. In the 2nd year, students start practicing on pre-clinical dental equipment, which is fitted with phantom heads, which simulate a real dental care unit and allow learning the correct working ergonomics from day one. Starting from the 3rd year students undergo practical training in RSU Institute of Stomatology.

Even though RSU has always been recognised as a university of health sciences, RSU faculty of European Studies has 25 years of experience in providing study programmes in social sciences. The faculty currently offers 4 study programmes in English medium. The programmes offer simulation-based and problem-based studies, team-teaching, interactive studies, interlinked courses as well as study visits abroad (international partnerships in Belgium, Germany, the Netherlands, Switzerland, India and other countries) and project development in cooperation with the RSU's B-Space Business Incubator.

Student life 

• The Rīga Stradiņš University Student Union (Studējošo pašpārvalde in Latvian, SP) is an organisation whose objective is to represent the interests of all university students in their academic and cultural lives. The Student Council has 36 members - all of them RSU students - representing students from all faculties of the University. Any student can become a member of the council by participating in the elections that are held each November. 

• The Rīga Stradiņš University (RSU) International Student Association’s (ISA) mission is to represent, serve and help improve the lives of all international students at RSU. ISA co-operates with the RSU Student Union, the International Department, and the deans of various faculties in order to help all our students with any queries or problems that they may have during their time at RSU.

• The Rīga Stradiņš University (RSU) student media network Skaļāk (Louder) is like a laboratory where students (future photographers, multimedia specialists, journalists and public relations specialists) can practice and hone their skills by filming, recording podcasts, shooting photo series and interviewing unusual people.
• Folk dance group "Ačkups" was founded in 1951, and already in 1975 it was awarded the status of a National Dance Group. Members of the "Ačkups" dance group include promising physicians, dentists and other RSU students, as well as graduates and students from other universities. The rehearsals are extremely spirited and lively within this student dance group, since all of them enjoy rehearsing and performing traditional Latvian folk dances.

• Mixed choir “Rīga” was established in 1951 and for almost 20 years (1967-1986) its conductor was the accomplished professor Jānis Dūmiņš. In 1968, the choir was awarded the status of National Choir. Over the years, the choir has been led by many talented conductors, e.g. Centis Kriķis, Kārlis Beinerts, Edvīns and Inga Dziļums, Ints Teterovskis, etc. The choir's conductors currently are Evita Taranda (since 2000) and Zane Zilberte (since 2006); Uģis Meņģelis is the choir master.

• The RSU Sports Club invites students and teachers to demonstrate their skills and abilities not just in their academic endeavours, but in sports as well. The RSU Sports Club offers students lessons in more than 10 sports and the opportunity to test their skills in annual tournaments. The RSU Sports Club offers basketball (for men and women), volleyball, hockey, aesthetic group gymnastics, table tennis, swimming, soccer, functional training, fitness pilates, gym, interval training on rowing and skiing ergometers, and others.

• B-Space is a business incubator created by Rīga Stradiņš University (RSU). It has been designed to support and promote innovation, leadership and business opportunities. Here you will find common rooms with everything you might need for both work and leisure: free wi-fi, office equipment, a kitchen and leisure areas, etc. The incubator provides students with a great opportunity to experiment and create prototypes of their ideas, meet like-minded people to build a team, consult with experts and receive support from mentors, participate in networking events and other events organised by the incubator.

• The Latvian Medical Student Association (LaMSA) is a non-governmental organisation that has been granted the status of public benefit organisation for the promotion of health and education and disease prevention. It is managed and operated by Latvian students and prospective health care professionals (medical-, dental- and public health students as well as rehabilitation professionals and others).

Awards 
• In 2015, RSU was recognized as one of the most exportable brands in Latvia, winning The Red Jackets award. And the Investment and Development Agency of Latvia, in cooperation with the Ministry of Economy, within the framework of the "Export and Innovation Award" competition, awarded Rīga Stradiņš University the Export Champion category.

• In 2016, the university received international recognition as a student-centered university according to the experts of PASCL (Peer Assessment of Student Centered Learning). PASCL is an EU-level project directed by the European Student Union, while the experts' visit to Riga was initiated by the RSU Student Self-Government. RSU is one of the few higher education institutions in Europe that was chosen for a PASCL expert visit.

• In 2018, Rīga Stradiņa University was recognized as the university with the best reputation in Latvia for the second year in a row, obtaining the highest score among the nine largest universities in Latvia. This was concluded in the study of the reputation of Latvian universities conducted by the research company Kantar TNS.

• In 2022 RSU was ranked among the world's top 501-600 universities in the Times Higher Education (THE) World University Rankings 2022. RSU is the highest ranked university in Latvia and has achieved the second best ranking among universities in the Baltic States.

• In 2022 RSU was ranked 401 – 500 in the world by the Times Higher Education (THE) World University Rankings 2022 in the clinical and health subject field.

• RSU ranks 801-1000 overall in the QS World University Rankings 2023. RSU received the highest ranking in international student ratio - 128th in the world (the best achievement among all Latvian and Baltic universities).

• RSU ranks in 119th place in the QS EECA University Rankings 2022. RSU received the highest results in two categories: share of international students and citation rate, ranking 16th and 17th in the region, respectively. In either category, RSU is placed highest among the Latvian universities.

• RSU ranks 1st in Latvia and 641st in the world in the SCImago Institutions Rankings 2022 international ranking of academic and research institutions (35 places higher than in 2021).

• In 2022, Rīga Stradiņa University was recognized as the university with the best reputation in Latvia for the sixth year in a row, obtaining the highest score among the nine largest universities in Latvia. This was concluded in the study of the reputation of Latvian universities conducted by the research company Kantar TNS.

Rectors 

 Ernests Burtnieks (1950–1958)
 Vasilijs Kalbergs (1958–1963)
 Vladislavs Korzāns (1963–1992)
 Jānis Vētra (1992–2007)
 Jānis Gardovskis (2008 - 2017)
 Aigars Pētersons (since 2017 until present)

Notable alumni 
RSU alumni include many prominent doctors and members in the society, including many former and present politicians, e.g.:
 Ingrīda Circene, former Minister for Health, 2003–2004, 2011-2014
 Gundars Daudze, former Speaker of the Saeima, 2007-2010
 Baiba Rozentāle, former Minister for Health, 2009-2010
 Maira Sudrabiņa, Chancery of the President of the Republic of Latvia, Secretary of the Chapter of Orders
 Valdis Zatlers, President of Latvia, 2007-2011
 Georgs Andrejevs, former Minister of Foreign Affairs, 1992-1994
 Juris Bārzdiņš, former Minister of Health, 2010-2011
 Jānis Birks, former Mayor of Riga, 2007-2009
 Teodors Eniņš, pioneer of magnetic impulse therapy, activist and co-chairman of the Popular Front of Latvia, former Minister of Welfare
 Didzis Gavars, former Minister of Health, 2010
 Jānis Straume, former Speaker of the Saeima, 1998-2002
 Boris Teterev, philanthropist behind the Boris and Ināra Teterev Foundation
 Ilze Viņķele, former Minister of Welfare, 2011–2014, McCain Institute scholar

References

External links 
 Official university webpage

 
Buildings and structures in Riga
Educational institutions established in 1950
Universities in Latvia
1950 establishments in the Soviet Union
Education in Riga
Universities and colleges formed by merger in Latvia
Universities and institutes established in the Soviet Union